Joe Don Baker (born February 12, 1936) is an American character actor and a life member of the Actors Studio. He established himself as an action star with supporting roles as a mysterious cowboy drifter in Guns of the Magnificent Seven (1969), and as a deputy sheriff in the western Wild Rovers (1971), before receiving fame for his roles as a mafia hitman in Charley Varrick (1973), real-life Tennessee Sheriff Buford Pusser in the action film Walking Tall (1973), a brute force detective in Mitchell (1975), deputy sheriff Thomas Jefferson Geronimo III in Final Justice (1985), and police chief Jerry Karlin in the action-comedy Fletch (1985). He is also known for his appearances as both a villain and an ally in three James Bond films: as Brad Whitaker in The Living Daylights (1987) and as CIA Agent Jack Wade in GoldenEye (1995) and Tomorrow Never Dies (1997).

Life and career

Baker was born in Groesbeck, Texas, the son of Edna (née McDonald) and Doyle Charles Baker. He attended the University of North Texas and graduated with a business degree in 1958. He served in the United States Army.

During the 1963-64 Broadway season, he appeared on stage in Marathon '33 at the ANTA Theatre in New York City. His career had its roots in television, though he did appear in several movies, including a part in the 1967 film Cool Hand Luke. He appeared in many television series, graduating to featured guest roles in such series as The Big Valley (in which he played a Harvard-educated Native American with a penchant for fighting) and  Mod Squad (where he appeared as an illiterate vending machine robber). He was the title character in the 1971 TV movie Mongo's Back in Town, starring Telly Savalas.

Standing at 6'2" tall (189 cm), Baker's physical prowess and stereotypical Texas drawl would prove perfect in Westerns, both on film and television. While working regularly on television on shows such as Bonanza and Gunsmoke, he appeared in supporting roles in such films Guns of the Magnificent Seven (1969) and Blake Edwards' Wild Rovers, but his film career did not quicken until he scored the role of Steve McQueen's younger brother in Sam Peckinpah's Junior Bonner, a film about a contemporary rodeo cowboy, which was released in late 1972.

Lancer 
Baker appeared in the pilot episode of 1968's Lancer, titled "The High Riders", as the main villain, "Day Pardee". This role was later fictionalized in Quentin Tarantino's 2019 film, Once Upon a Time in Hollywood—changed to 'Decoteau' and played by Leonardo DiCaprio as Rick Dalton. He went on to appear in a later episode as Clovis Horner in 1970.

Walking Tall 
His breakthrough came with the 1973 film Walking Tall, directed by Phil Karlson. He starred in the filmmaker's final work, Framed, two years later. Released in February as a regional exploitation picture, Walking Tall connected with audiences and became an unexpected hit, circulating for national distribution with a new TV ad campaign using the slogan, "When was the last time you stood up and applauded a movie?" The film eventually earned $23 million at the box office. His performance was praised by influential film critic Pauline Kael, but he decided not to star in the sequel.

Later that year, his work in Charley Varrick helped solidify Baker's reputation. He also co-starred with Robert Duvall in the 1973 crime film The Outfit and starred in the 1974 adventure film Golden Needles. In 1977 he had leading roles in Checkered Flag or Crash opposite Susan Sarandon and The Shadow of Chikara with Ted Neeley and Sondra Locke.

On April 10 1978, the two part television program To Kill a Cop premiered. In it Baker is paired with Louis Gossett Jr. as police detective. Baker co-starred with Karen Black in the miniseries Power (1980), a scarcely-disguised story of labor leader Jimmy Hoffa.

Baker played the Whammer, a baseball player modeled on Babe Ruth, in the 1984 baseball drama The Natural, which starred Robert Redford. In 1985, he portrayed the corrupt Chief Jerry Karlin in Fletch. In the UK, he played CIA agent Darius Jedburgh in the BBC Television drama serial Edge of Darkness. He was nominated for Best Actor by the British Academy Television Awards, losing to his co-star Bob Peck. Martin Scorsese directed him as a private detective in the 1991 remake of Cape Fear, hired by protagonist Sam Bowden (Nick Nolte) to protect his family from psychopathic ex-convict Max Cady (Robert De Niro).

Baker received the Distinguished Alumni Award from the University of North Texas in 1994.

While actor Carroll O'Connor was undergoing coronary bypass surgery, Baker took his place on the television series In the Heat of the Night. Baker appeared as Captain Tom Dugan, a retired police captain who substituted while O'Connor's character was away at a police convention. More recently, he appeared in Joe Dirt, The Dukes of Hazzard, and Strange Wilderness.

In 2009, Baker delivered another performance in The Cleaner on A&E, playing an alcoholic military veteran attempting to help a friend cope with the loss of his son. He hires William Banks (played by Benjamin Bratt) to help him start back down the road to sobriety. Baker played King in Mud.(2012)

James Bond series
In 1987, Baker played the villainous arms dealer Brad Whitaker in the James Bond film The Living Daylights, starring Timothy Dalton as 007. In 1995 and 1997, Baker returned to the series, this time playing a different character, CIA agent Jack Wade, in GoldenEye and Tomorrow Never Dies, with Pierce Brosnan as Bond. Baker is one of four actors to appear as both a Bond ally and a villain, the others being Charles Gray, who appeared as Henderson in You Only Live Twice and Ernst Stavro Blofeld in Diamonds Are Forever; Walter Gotell, who appeared as Morzeny, the SPECTRE Island trainer, in From Russia with Love and as General Gogol, the chief of the KGB, in six films between 1977 and 1987; and Richard Kiel as Jaws, in The Spy Who Loved Me and Moonraker, becoming Bond's ally against villain Hugo Drax (Michael Lonsdale) in the latter film.

FilmographyHoney West (TV show, Episode 15 "Rockabye the Hard Way", Dec. 24, 1965) as truckdriver Rocky HansenCool Hand Luke (1967) as Fixer (uncredited)The Big Valley (TV show, Episode "Lightfoot," 1969) as Tom Lightfoot Gunsmoke (TV show) Episodes "Prime of Life" (1966) as Woody Stoner & "The Reprisal" (1969) as Tom ButlerGuns of the Magnificent Seven (1969) as SlaterAdam at 6 A.M. (1970) as Harvey GavinThe High Chaparral (1970), Season 4, Ep. 17The F.B.I. (1970), Season 5, Ep. 22Lancer (TV show, Episode 1 "The High Riders", (Sept. 24, 1968) as Day Pardee. Followed by Episode 13  "Shadow of a Dead Man", (Jan. 6, 1970) as Clovis Horner. Wild Rovers (1971) as Paul BuckmanMission Impossible (TV show) Episode "The Miracle" (1971) as Frank Kearney Welcome Home, Soldier Boys (1971) as DannyJunior Bonner (1972) as Curly BonnerThe Valachi Papers (1972) as Irish member of Valachi gang (uncredited)That Certain Summer (1972) as Phil BonnerThe Streets of San Francisco (TV show, Episode "Beyond Vengeance", aired Mar. 8, 1973) as criminal Leonard Collier Cord Walking Tall (1973) as Buford PusserCharley Varrick (1973) as MollyThe Outfit  (1973) as Jack CodyGolden Needles  (1974) as DanFramed (1975) as Ron LewisMitchell (1975) (also a Mystery Science Theater 3000 episode) as MitchellCheckered Flag or Crash (1977) as Walkaway MaddenThe Shadow of Chikara (1977) as Wishbone CutterSpeedtrap (1977) as Pete NovickThe Pack (1977) as Jerry PrestonEischied (1979) as Chief of Detectives Earl EischiedWacko (1982) as Dick HarbingerJoysticks (1983) as Joseph RutterThe Natural (1984) as The WhammerEdge of Darkness (1985) as Darius Jedburgh (miniseries)Final Justice (1985) (also a Mystery Science Theater 3000 episode) as Deputy Sheriff Thomas Jefferson Geronimo III Fletch (1985) as Chief Jerry KarlinGetting Even (1986) as King R. KendersonThe Living Daylights (1987) as Brad WhitakerThe Killing Time (1987) as Carl CunninghamLeonard Part 6 (1987) as Nick SnyderburnCriminal Law (1988) as Det. MeselDefrosting The Fridge (1989) as Hunter McCallIn The Heat of The Night (TV show, Episode "Forever Fifteen", 1989) as Tom DuganThe Children (1990) as Cliffe WheaterCape Fear (1991) as Claude KersekCitizen Cohn (1992) (TV-movie) as Sen. Joseph McCarthyThe Distinguished Gentleman (1992) as Olaf AndersenReality Bites (1994) as Tom PierceRing of Steel (1994) as Man in BlackUnderneath (1995) as DonovanPanther (1995) as BrimmerCongo (1995) as R.B. TravisThe Grass Harp (1995) as Sheriff Junius CandleGoldenEye (1995) as Jack WadeDisney's Animated Storybook: Winnie the Pooh and the Honey Tree (1995) as Owl (voice; video game)Mars Attacks! (1996) as Glenn NorrisGeorge Wallace (1997) (TV-movie) as Big Jim FolsomTomorrow Never Dies (1997) as Jack WadePoodle Springs (1998) (HBO) as P.J. ParkerVegas, City of Dreams (2001) as Dylan GarrettJoe Dirt (2001) as Don, Brandy's Dad (uncredited)The Commission (2003) as Rep. Hale BoggsThe Dukes of Hazzard (2005) as Gov. Jim ApplewhiteStrange Wilderness (2008) as Bill CalhounThe Cleaner (2009, "Last American Casualty") as Major Larry DurenMud'' (2012) as King

References

External links

Joe Don Baker at the University of Wisconsin's Actors Studio audio collection

1936 births
20th-century American male actors
21st-century American male actors
American male film actors
American male television actors
Living people
Male actors from Texas
People from Groesbeck, Texas
University of North Texas alumni